"Leave It" is a song by English rock band Yes. It appears on their 1983 album, 90125.

The song peaked at number 24 on the Billboard Hot 100 and number 3 on the Top Album Rock Tracks chart. In the UK, the song rose to number 56 in late March 1984, in a run of five weeks on the chart.

The song is the second track on the album's second side, with the song "Cinema" serving as a form of prelude.

Release
It was the second song from that album to be released as a single. The 12-inch single release (ATCO 0-96964) featured an extended "Hello, Goodbye" remix by Trevor Horn (9:30) as the A-side, with the B-side consisting of the 7-inch single remix (3:52) and the A Capella remix (3:19). The 7-inch single includes the two B-side tracks of the 12".

There were repeated single-issues, most backed with remixes of the song or an a cappella version. The original version was occasionally placed as the B-side of "Owner of a Lonely Heart", and on another instance, the original version was found on a 12-inch single with another A-side track, "City of Love". The song has the distinction of being the only track from 90125 virtually unaltered, in terms of writing, from the version recorded by Squire, Rabin, White and Kaye before Jon Anderson rejoined and, by the same token, one of only two tracks on the album whose credits do not include Anderson.

Reception
"Leave It" has been described as the band's "funkiest" song, "riding out a nimble bass groove, ping-ponging choral vocals, and 's unexpected violin flourishes."  Also notable, according to Stuart Chambers, are the use of sampled drum sounds, the "chorale effect’’, taken by Anderson, to a "higher plateau" and the importance of Horn’s production.

Cash Box described "Leave It" as having "a rather unnerving mixture of urgent, albeit contradictory, elements" and said that it starts with  "a rich studio chorale intro" and has a "real tasty Vanilla Funk groove."

Music video
The music video (directed by Godley and Creme) depicts the band members standing in a line and dressed in black business suits as their images go through video-created abstract effects. It was one of the first music videos to utilize computer-generated imagery. Eighteen different variations of the video were made (the first one, for instance, simply had the band upside-down, but motionless for the whole song, while the seventh one was just the first one but with only Jon Anderson), with the eleventh one chosen as the "standard" version, and has remained the "official" video. A half-hour documentary on the making of the video was broadcast on MTV in 1984. Also, a marathon showing all eighteen videos, one after the other, was also shown on MTV.

Personnel

Yes
Jon Anderson – co-lead vocals, backing vocals
Chris Squire – bass guitar, backing vocals
Trevor Rabin – co-lead vocals, guitars, keyboards, backing vocals
Alan White – drums, percussion, Fairlight CMI, backing vocals
Tony Kaye – keyboards, backing vocals

Production
Trevor Horn – producer
Gary Langan – engineer
Steve Lipson – engineer
Garry Mouat of Assorted Images – single packaging

Live performances
"Leave It" appeared in a similar manner on the 9012Live tour as it had on the album; it was the second song performed each night, with "Cinema" serving as the intro. The song was performed on all 113 shows of the 9012Live tour, but has never been performed by the band since.

References

1984 singles
Yes (band) songs
Song recordings produced by Trevor Horn
Songs written by Trevor Rabin
Songs written by Chris Squire
Music videos directed by Godley and Creme
1983 songs
British new wave songs
Songs written by Trevor Horn
Atco Records singles